The 1995 Andorran local elections were held on 3 December. Voters elected the council members of the seven parishes.

They were the first local elections after the legalisation of political parties in 1993.

Electoral system
The electoral law was changed together with the approval of the new Constitution and the legalisation of political parties. Voters elect the members of the municipal councils (consells de comú in Catalan). The electoral law allows the municipal councils to choose their numbers of seats, which must be an even number between 10 and 16.

All city council members are elected in single multi-member districts, consisting of the whole parish, using closed lists. Half of the seats are allocated to the party with the most votes. The other half of the seats are allocated using the Hare quota (including the winning party). With this system the winning party obtains an absolute majority.

The cònsol major (mayor) and the cònsol menor (deputy mayor) are elected indirectly by the municipal councillors.

Results

Overall 
Following the elections, two women were elected cònsols majors (mayors) for first time in Andorra.

Canillo

Encamp

Ordino

La Massana

Andorra la Vella

Sant Julià de Lòria

Escaldes-Engordany

References

External links
Election results (Government of Andorra)

1995
Andorra
1995 in Andorra